E430 may refer to:
 E430, an E number compound.
 Mercedes-Benz E430, a passenger car
 Yuneec International E430, a two-seat electric aircraft